Fury in Petticoats is a 1962 television play broadcast by the Australian Broadcasting Corporation. It was directed by Christopher Muir. 
It was based on a play which had been filmed by British TV the year before.

Although fictional, the plot is based on a historical incident in 1836, when naturalist Charles Darwin brought to England four natives from the island of Tierra del Fuego, near South America. Some changes were made from historical fact - the Fugeia was older.

Plot
The Reverend William Dill, his wife Augusta and daughter Anne are preparing to meet the curate Edward Parslowe and his friend Charles Darwin for dinner. Edward loves Anne but Augusta wants her daughted to meet Charles Darwin. Darwin talks about a native girl, Fuegia, they have brought bac. Anne decides to attempt to convert her to Christianity. (played by Kay Kelton) goes to live in an English country vicarage.

Cast
Lola Brooks as Anne Dill
Michael Duffield as Rev. William Dill
Norman Kaye as Charles Darwin
Mark Kelly as Edward
Fay Kelton as Fuegia Basket
Elizabeth Wing as Mrs. Dill

Production
It was shot in Melbourne.

Reception
The Sydney Morning Herald wrote that:
[It] was an oddly contrived story produced in that stilted solemn atmosphere to which "period" plays often conform. The fact that Charles Darwin once brought a few sad and sorry natives from Terra del Fuego to England could possibly be the basis for a seriously realistic glimpse of early colour problems, or else, perhaps, be artificially brightened into a spirited comedy... Morgan attempted to provide humour and also facile generalisations in a play which neither illuminates nor 'sparkles. The native girl... unconvincingly combined the antics of a savage monkey with an unlikely capacity for sophisticated, fluent reasoning, and the reactions of the prim nineteenth century vicarage were equally unconvincing and lacking in continuity. The actors did not do much to enliven their pasteboard parts, with the exception of Lola Brooks, who managed to bring a sensitive and natural manner to her part.
The Bulletin said it was "a big improvement" on Muir's earlier Boy Around the Corner.

The Age called it "good television... an unpretentious play, well mounted and with straight forward production."

References

External links

1960s Australian television plays
Australian Broadcasting Corporation original programming
English-language television shows
1962 television plays